Peter Walter Edward Rawson (born 25 May 1957 in Salisbury, Rhodesia) is a former Zimbabwean cricketer. He played ten ODIs for Zimbabwe between 1983 and 1987.

An opening bowler and useful lower-order batsman, Rawson represented Zimbabwe at the 1983 and 1987 Cricket World Cups. In 1983 he took early wickets in the matches against India and West Indies that in each case briefly put Zimbabwe in a strong position.

In 1984 he played for Rishton in the Lancashire League, taking 102 wickets at 14.08 and scoring 539 runs at 22.46, and he also played Minor Counties cricket for Suffolk.

He left Zimbabwe in 1989 and played the rest of his career with Natal in South Africa, retiring after the 1994–95 season.

His highest first-class score was 95 for Natal against Transvaal in 1989–90. His best innings bowling figures were 7 for 30 for Zimbabwe against the touring Lancashire team in 1988–89, and his best match figures were 13 for 143 (7 for 55 and 6 for 88) for Zimbabwe against Young Australia in 1982–83. In 1983–84, he helped Zimbabwe to a two-wicket victory over Young India by bowling unchanged throughout the match and taking 4 for 70 and 7 for 49.

He is now the Sales and Marketing Director at Trellidor, a home security company in Durban.

References

External links
 Peter Rawson at Cricinfo
 Peter Rawson at Cricket Archive

1957 births
Living people
Cricketers from Harare
White Zimbabwean sportspeople
Zimbabwean people of British descent
Zimbabwe One Day International cricketers
Zimbabwean cricketers
KwaZulu-Natal cricketers
Suffolk cricketers
Cricketers at the 1983 Cricket World Cup
Cricketers at the 1987 Cricket World Cup